The Secret Six was a name given (by James Doherty of The Chicago Tribune) to six influential businessmen in Chicago who organized the business community against Al Capone.

Formation  
The event that triggered the formation of the Secret Six was the shooting of a building contractor's superintendent, Philip Meagher, on February 5, 1930 at the construction site of the Lying-In Hospital (later part of the University of Chicago Hospitals) at 59th and Maryland Avenue. The superintendent's employer, Harrison Barnard, went to the Chicago Association of Commerce (CAC), now the Chicagoland Chamber of Commerce, demanding action. The CAC's president, Colonel Robert Isham Randolph, shortly after announced that he was the spokesman of a committee formed to prevent and punish crime. Randolph said the members of the committee did not want to reveal their names. When asked by Doherty how many there were, Randolph replied, "half a dozen."

Eliot Ness gets his commission 
The Secret Six hired Alexander Jamie, who had been Chief Special Agent of the Department of Justice, as its chief investigator. He was the brother-in-law of Eliot Ness. Jamie influenced Randolph to speak with U.S. District Attorney, George Emmerson Q. Johnson, and through Johnson Eliot Ness got his special commission.

Of the Secret Six, in his book, The Untouchables, Eliot Ness says this, "These six men were gambling with their lives, unarmed, to accomplish what three thousand police and three hundred prohibition agents had failed miserably to accomplish: The liquidation of a criminal combine which paid off in dollars to the greedy and death to the too-greedy or incorruptible."

Activity  
Very little is known of their operations, mandated as they were to be secret. It is known they set up a speakeasy in Cicero known as the Garage Café to acquire information. They provided funds to execute the tax evasion case that eventually put Al Capone behind bars, and paid for a trip to South America for a cashier who informed against the mobsters.

Alexander G. Jamie summed the work of the Secret Six as follows: It handled 595 cases, aided in 55 convictions, with sentences totaling 428 years. Fines of $11,525 had been paid, and they recovered $605,000 in bonds and $52,280 in merchandise. The Secret Six handled 25 kidnapping and extortion cases in which nine convictions were made.

Members 
Twenty years later James Doherty wrote an article entitled, "Curtains for Capone", in which he states, "To this day there has been no disclosure of the identity of the crime fighters known as the Secret Six. Even I don’t know them and I gave them the name that went all over the world in 1930."

In his scrapbook found years after his death, Harrison Barnard wrote on Doherty's 1951 article, "I was one of the Secret Six." Since he was the one whose employee was shot, and he brought the matter to the Chicago Association of Commerce, which brought the committee into existence, it is a reasonable inference that he was one of the committee. He was a prominent businessman, a trustee of the University of Chicago and Shedd Aquarium.

U.S. Bureau of Investigation reports (1932) indicate that Robert Isham Randolph, Julius Rosenwald (president of Sears, Roebuck and Company), and Frank J. Loesch belong to the Secret Six. In interviews Randolph gave to the press after Capone's conviction, he disclosed that Samuel Insull, the utilities magnate, and Rosenwald were in the Secret Six. Judge John H. Lyle (1960), who was directly involved in the private war on Capone, named Edward E. Gore, Samuel Insull, and George A. Paddock as members of the Secret Six.

Further reading 
Bergreen, Laurence, Capone: The Man and the Era, Touchstone, Simon & Schuster, c1994
Grant, Bruce, Fight for a City, Rand McNally, c1955
Lyle, John H., The Dry and Lawless Years, Prentice Hall, c1960
Ness, Eliot with Oscar Fraley, The Untouchables, Julian Messner, c1957

Civil crime prevention
History of Chicago
Chicago Outfit
Al Capone